Birley ward — which includes the districts of Base Green, Birley Estate, Charnock, Frecheville, Scowerdons and part of Hackenthorpe — is one of the 28 electoral wards in City of Sheffield, England. The population of this ward in 2011 was 16,943 people in 7,393 households. It is one of the five wards that make up the Sheffield South East constituency.

Birley

Birley Estate is a housing estate in the southeastern part of Sheffield. It is built on what was Birley Moor just to the north of the small hamlet of Birley. Birley Spa to the northeast was a hotel and spa built in 1842 around a spring of mineral water. The building was restored in 2001/02 and is Grade II listed.

The original hamlet  featured farmland and farm buildings, most of which are now used to house the Birley Wood Golf Club.

Birley Wood Golf Club
Birley Wood Golf Club is a golf club located at Birley. The course sits on land that was historically in Derbyshire, being located to the north of Ridgeway, close to the Derbyshire border near Eckington. The A6135 runs parallel with the course.

The club was founded in 1974, on the site of the original hamlet of Birley, the clubhouses are housed in original buildings.

Base Green
Base Green is a housing estate to the west of Birley and east of Gleadless. It is built on the land that was formerly Basegreen Farm, with the remains of an old orchard still evident within the playing fields of what is now Jaunty Park. 

What was Base Green Junior School, for pupils in between Frecheville Infant School and Frecheville Comprehensive School, is now housing.

Quarry Vale Road and Quarry Vale Grove sit behind what was once a quarry, along the ancient border of the Shire Brook.  The hill above Quarry Vale Road and Quarry Vale Grove used to be Frecheville Comprehensive School and its extensive school fields, where Manchester United footballer George Best once filmed a series of short football programmes for BBC TV.

Charnock

Charnock (sometimes called Charnock Hall) is a housing estate to the south of Basegreen. The estate was built on the former Charnockhall Farm which stood where Farm Close is today.

Charnock Hall Primary School
Charnock Hall Primary School is a primary school which currently educates around 400 pupils, aged 5–11. The report of the Ofsted inspection, in June 2010, assessed the school as being Good, point two on a four-point scale.  The school has the Healthy Schools Award, the Artsmark Silver, and the Green Flag Award.

Charnock Recreation Grounds
Situated on Carter Hall Lane, and next to Charnock Hall Primary School, The Charnock Recreation grounds is a large community park.

In January 2006, The Friends of Charnock Recreation Grounds group was launched. Through the work of the group, the park has been subjected to a range of improvements including the addition of new playground equipment, a running track, and outdoor gym equipment.

Frecheville

Origins
Frecheville is a housing estate to the north of Birley Estate developed in the 1930s by Henry Boot Limited.  The firm constructed around 1,600 private houses, mainly traditional brick built 2 or 3 bedroom semi-detached family homes for rent and gave the Frecheville estate its name.  A local pub's signboard shows the coat of arms of the Frecheville family, who were lords of the manor at Staveley but there is no evidence that the Frechevilles ever owned land on Birley Moor, so the name given to Frecheville remains something of a mystery.  

Frecheville was historically in Derbyshire, until 1967.

Frecheville is home to the well-known Frecheville Pond, with ducks, swans, and fishing, and also houses the parish church, library, and community centre provided for the neighbourhood by the builder which still has an active forum,  and has run the Frecheville carnival every year between 1937 and 2006 with the exception of during the war years.  The majority of homes on the estate are now owner-occupied after being handed over to residents in the 1950s.

Famous Inhabitants
Ex-Sheffield United football manager Neil Warnock was born on Youlgreave Drive in Frecheville Sheffield. 
Coronation Street actor Ian Reddington also grew up on Youlgreave Drive in  Frecheville Sheffield.
Susan Ann Sulley and Joanne Catherall of The Human League both attended Frecheville Comprehensive School.
Mark Pearson who went on to play for Manchester United attended Frecheville Comprehensive School.
Wayne Furniss of Pulp attended Frecheville Comprehensive School, while lead singer Jarvis Cocker of Pulp grew up in neighbouring Intake.
Crime Novelist Simon Beckett attended Frecheville Comprehensive School.
1970s History Teacher and Head of Sixth Form at Frecheville Comprehensive Alan Farmer went on to teacher training in Lancaster, before writing dozens of definitive history text books, with a special interest in the United States Civil War.

Hackenthorpe

Most of Hackenthorpe (down the hill from Birley Moor Road) is in the Beighton ward. The significant historic site here is Birley Spa.

Footnotes

External links
 Sources for the history of Birley Produced by Sheffield City Council's Libraries and Archives

Wards of Sheffield